The 2002 FIFA World Cup qualification,  ran from 2000 to  2001 in order to determine the three representatives at the 2002 FIFA World Cup. For an overview of the qualification rounds, see 2002 FIFA World Cup qualification.

A total of 35 CONCACAF teams entered the competition. Guyana withdrew before playing, leaving 34 nations in the race. Mexico, USA, Jamaica and Costa Rica, the four highest-ranked teams according to FIFA, received byes and advanced to the semi-finals, while Canada advanced directly to the "play-offs" between Caribbean and Central teams. The remaining teams were divided into two zones, based on geographical locations.

Format
 Caribbean Zone: The 24 teams were divided into  groups of eight teams each. The teams played in a three-round knockout tournament. The winners would advance to the semi-finals, while the runners-up would advance to the play-offs. Due to Guyana not playing, Antigua & Barbuda joined the second round directly.
 Central American Zone: The six teams were divided into two groups of three teams. The teams played against each other. The winners of the group would advance to the semi-finals, while the runners-up would advance to the play-offs.
 In the play-offs, Canada and the five concerned teams were paired up to play knockout matches on a home-and-away basis. A team from North or Central America would play against a team from the Caribbean, and the three winners would advance to the semi-finals.

In the semi-finals round, the 12 teams were divided into three groups of four teams each. They played against each other on a home-and-away basis. The group winners and runners-up would advance to the final round.

In the final round, the six teams played against each other on a home-and-away basis. The top three teams would qualify for the 2002 FIFA World Cup. This year there is no play-off against another continent.

Caribbean Zone

Group 1

Group 2
In the first round, Guyana were suspended by FIFA, Antigua and Barbuda obtained a bye to Round 2.

Group 3

Central American Zone

Group A

Group B

Caribbean/Central American play-offs

|}

Semifinal round

Group 1

Group 2

Group 3

Final round

Qualified teams
The following three teams from CONCACAF qualified for the final tournament.

1 Bold indicates champions for that year. Italic indicates hosts for that year.

Goalscorers
There were 392 goals scored in 144 matches, for an average of 2.72 goals per match.

15 goals

 Carlos Pavón

11 goals

 Golman Pierre

10 goals

 Rolando Fonseca

9 goals

 Cuauhtémoc Blanco

8 goals

 Carlos Ruiz
 Milton Núñez
 Onandi Lowe
 Earnie Stewart

7 goals

 Jerry Alexander
 Paulo Wanchope
 Raúl Díaz Arce

6 goals

 Samuel Caballero
 Jared Borgetti
 James Chewitt
 Angus Eve

5 goals

 Llewlyn Riley
 Freddy García
 Francisco Ramírez
 Alwyn Guy
 Arnold Dwarika
 Dwight Yorke

4 goals

 Jean-Robert Menelas
 Amado Guevara
 Rodney Jack
 Marvin Andrews
 Joe-Max Moore

3 goals

 Gregory Grayson
 Shaun Goater
 Hernán Medford
 Jorge Roberto Rodríguez
 Juan Carlos Plata
 Vladimir Edouard
 Gabriel Michel
 Danilo Turcios
 José Manuel Abundis
 Víctor Ruiz
 Jorge Dely Valdés
 Julio Dely Valdés
 Keith Gumbs
 Alexis Saddler
 Stern John
 Russell Latapy
 Nigel Pierre
 Ante Razov

2 goals

 Theodore Filomina
 Kevin Davies
 Anton Haven
 Gregory Goodridge
 Stephen Astwood
 Shannon Burgess
 John Barry Nusum
 Rónald Gómez
 Jafet Soto
 Lester Moré
 Luis Omar Zapata
 Elías Montes
 Guillermo Rivera
 Anthony Modeste
 Guillermo Ramírez
 Julio César de León
 David Suazo
 Deon Burton
 Antonio de Nigris
 Miguel Zepeda
 Raphel Ortiz
 Leroy Francis
 Austin Huggins
 George Isaac
 John Smith
 Kenlyn Gonsalves
 Marlon James
 Clint Mathis
 Brian McBride
 Josh Wolff

1 goal

 Kenneth Hughes
 Richard O'Connor
 Desmond Bleau
 Wandel Gross
 Santana Vander Kross
 Oswalding Mackay
 Mark Mackay
 Rafael Santana
 George Moussis
 Norman Forde
 Emory Núñez
 Norman Nuñez
 Devarr Boyles
 Paul Cam
 Stanton Lewis
 Kyle Lightbourne
 Tokia Russell
 Meshach Wade
 Avondale Williams
 Jim Brennan
 Jason de Vos
 Steven Bryce
 Rodrigo Cordero
 Alejandro Madrigal
 Luis Marín
 Reynaldo Parks
 Mauricio Solís
 William Sunsing
 Ariel Álvarez
 Miguel Gandara
 Osmin Hernández
 Luis Marten
 Serguei Prado
 Kelvyn Peters
 Vladimir Gregorio
 Miguel Pérez
 Carlos Reyes
 Luis Omar Sanchez
 Carlos Castro Borja
 Ronald Cerritos
 Mauricio Cienfuegos
 Vladimir Cubías
 Elmer Martínez
 Roberto Guadalupe Martínez
 Juan Carlos Padilla
 Daniel Sagastizaga
 William Torres
 Franklyn Baptiste
 Otis Roberts
 Mario Acevedo
 Juan Manuel Funes
 Dwight Pezzarossi
 Rudy Ramírez
 Édgar Valencia
 Roosevelt Desir
 Dieuphane Thelamour
 Jorge Bengoché
 Renán Bengoche
 Alex Pineda Chacón
 Iván Guerrero
 Rony Morales
 Francisco Antonio Pavón
 José Luis Pineda
 Luis Alfredo Ramírez
 Christian Santamaría
 Luis Santamaría
 Wilmer Velásquez
 Ricardo Gardner
 Jamie Lawrence
 Tyrone Marshall
 Theodore Whitmore
 Andy Williams
 Jesús Arellano
 Duilio Davino
 Alberto García Aspe
 Rafael Márquez
 Francisco Palencia
 Pável Pardo
 Ramón Ramírez
 Wayne Dyer
 Angelo Martina
 Roberto Brown
 Neftali Díaz
 Mario Méndez
 Carlos Astondoa
 Michael Crawford
 Renne Regis
 Jamal Ballantyne
 Wesley Charles
 Vincent John
 Kendall Velox
 Alberto Doesburg
 Reynold Carrington
 Stokely Mason
 Anthony Rougier
 John O'Brien
 Cobi Jones
 Eddie Pope
 Tab Ramos
 Joaquim Santos

1 own goal

 Philip Skeal (playing against Saint Vincent and the Grenadines)
 Carlos Geerman (playing against Puerto Rico)
 Paul Fenwick (playing against Mexico)
 Alexander Cruzata (playing against Barbados)
 Heriberto Morales (playing against Jamaica)
 Jorge Dely Valdés (playing against Trinidad and Tobago)

Broadcasting rights

Americas 
 : ESPN, Telemundo (Spanish), Univision (Spanish), Setanta Sports, Sun Sports
 : Setanta Sports and Sportsnet 
 : Teletica 7
  Puerto Rico: Setanta Sports en Español 
  Honduras: Televicentro and VTV 
  El Salvador: TCS
  Mexico: Televisa, TV Azteca

References

External links
FIFA official page
RSSSF - 2002 World Cup Qualification
Allworldcup

 
CONCACAF
FIFA World Cup qualification (CONCACAF)

fr:Tours préliminaires à la Coupe du monde de football 2002#Amérique du Nord, centrale et Caraïbes
lt:XVII pasaulio futbolo čempionato atranka#Šiaurės Amerika